A Kneipp facility is a construction or devise in a spa or special park that is used for the Kneipp hydrotherapy, also called "Kneipp Cure" or "Kneippism". It was founded and developed by the Bavarian-German priest Sebastian Kneipp in the 19th century who was one of the forefathers of the naturopathic medicine movement.

The Kneipp facilities are mostly water oriented applications which have various methods, temperatures and pressure, for example water treading facilities and arm basins fed by springs, water pumps or the public drinking water network. It also includes constructions like barefoot walking paths and variations for children. It is especially common in German-speaking countries and isn now also part of spa areas in some international luxury hotels.

Gallery

Further reading 
 Hydrotherapy#Modern revival
 Naturopathy#History

External links 

 Construction instructions for a Kneipp facility (in German)

References 

Hydrotherapy